Hesam "Sam" Asghari (born March 3, 1994) is an Iranian-American model, actor, and fitness trainer. He has appeared on the television shows Black Monday, Hacks, The Family Business, and in several music videos. Since 2020, Asghari has been the owner of the eponymous Asghari Fitness, a website that offers personalized training programs.

After becoming engaged in late 2021, Asghari married singer Britney Spears in 2022.

Early life and education 
Hesam Asghari was born on March 3, 1994, in Tehran, Iran, to Mike and Fatima Asghari. The youngest of four children, he has sisters Maddy, Ellie, and Faye. He started gymnastics at four years old, moving to the United States nine years later at age 13 when he knew no English. Asghari shortened his given name Hesam to Sam as it was considered easier to pronounce. In high school, he took theater classes, acting in the plays Hamlet and Macbeth, and played football. After high school, he attended Moorpark College in Moorpark, California, where he continued playing football as a starting tight end.

Career 
At age 21, Asghari was introduced to modeling by his sister Faye. His first runway show was in Palm Springs, California for designer Michael Costello. Asghari has modeled for multiple magazines, including having spreads in Vulkan, Men's Health, Iron Man, GQ, and others. In 2019, he received a Daytime Beauty Award at the 2nd annual Daytime Beauty Awards for Outstanding Achievement in Fitness.

In 2018, Asgahri appeared in his film debut in the parody Star Trek spoof Unbelievable!!!!! headed by Snoop Dogg. Asghari's role was a cameo. In 2021, he appeared in Black Monday season 3 for a multi-episode arc, in which he played Giancarlo, "a super sexy model who works for Pfaffashions." Later the same year, he appeared on the television show Hacks for an episode as a "sexy Santa"; he stated, "Working with Jean Smart — I'm flattered to work with such amazing talents that have been around the craft for such a long time. She was so professional. We had a great time." Producer Lucia Aniello praised Asghari for the role, stating, "He was really funny. He improvised a ton. He looked like Sexy Santa. He just checked all the boxes and he was really so sweet and funny. We just loved him." Also in 2021, he auditioned for the part of Carrie Bradshaw's physical therapist Travis on the And Just Like That... episode "Tragically Hip", but was not selected for the role.

In October 2021, Asghari joined the action thriller film Hot Seat as a co-star alongside Mel Gibson and Kevin Dillon. People noted it would be Asghari's first major film role. Director James Cullen Bressack told TooFab Asghari is "one of the nicest people, he's such a kind human being and he's a very talented actor. I think people are gonna like his role in this. He knows how to do some really cool action shots and I think he shows it off in the movie so it's pretty exciting." Asghari portrayed SWAT Sergeant Tobias, a role for which he had been physically training.

Asghari has said he has avoided roles that play into Middle Eastern stereotypes, such as terrorist characters. He has declined appearances on two reality television shows: Celebrity Big Brother and the Masked Singer.

Personal life 
Asghari became an American citizen in 2012.

Asghari formerly dated American actress and singer Mayra Verónica after appearing in the music video accompanying her song, "No Boyfriend, No Problem".

Asghari first met Britney Spears, who is 13 years his senior, when she selected him to appear in her 2016 music video for "Slumber Party" featuring Tinashe. The two got engaged in September 2021. Before marrying, Asghari and Spears signed a prenuptial agreement to protect Spears' fortune, estimated at approximately $60 million as of June 2022.

On April 11, 2022, Spears claimed that she was pregnant with her third child and Asghari's first. She suffered a miscarriage a month later. Asghari and Spears married June 9, 2022, at Spears' California home. After the wedding, they moved to a new $11.8 million dollar mansion in Calabasas, which Spears purchased.

Filmography

References

External links 
 

1994 births
American people of Iranian descent
Britney Spears
Iranian emigrants to the United States
Living people
People from Tehran